Xerochlamys undulata is a shrub in the family Sarcolaenaceae. It is endemic to Madagascar.

Description
Xerochlamys undulata grows as a shrub with pubescent twigs. Its leaves are bright green above, dull green on the underside. The tree's flowers are solitary or in inflorescences of two flowers, with yellow to white petals.

Distribution and habitat
Xerochlamys undulata is only found in the central regions of Ihorombe and Atsimo-Andrefana. One population of the plants occurs in Isalo National Park. The preliminary status of the species is endangered.

References

undulata
Endemic flora of Madagascar
Plants described in 2009